This list of international literacy prizes is an index to articles about notable international prizes for promoting literacy. 
They are awarded by UNESCO and other organizations.

See also
 List of education awards

References

 
International Literacy Prizes
Education awards

UNESCO awards